Events from the year 1851 in Ireland.

Events
 30 March – the United Kingdom Census shows that, as part of the legacy of the Great Famine, the population of Ireland has fallen to 6,575,000 – a drop of 1,600,000 in ten years. This is the first census to note use of the Irish language.
 1 August – Midland Great Western Railway extended from Mullingar to Galway.
 7 August – Poor Relief (Ireland) Act provides for the establishment of dispensaries.
 Construction of MacNeill's Egyptian Arch, a railway bridge near Newry on the Dublin-Belfast railway line is completed.
 Tillie and Henderson open their first shirt factory in Derry.

Unknown date
 Jacob's brand of biscuits, bars and coffee is founded; their first biscuit is possibly Goldgrain.

Births
8 January – William McDonnell, 6th Earl of Antrim, peer (died 1918).
14 March – Paddy Ryan, boxer (died 1900).
17 March – Ted Sullivan, Major League Baseball player and manager (died 1929 in the United States).
21 March – Henry Prittie, 4th Baron Dunalley, peer and Lord Lieutenant of County Tipperary 1905–1922 (died 1927).
4 April – James Campbell, 1st Baron Glenavy, lawyer, Lord Chancellor of Ireland, first Chairman of Seanad Éireann (died 1931).
22 May – William Moxley, representative from Illinois's 6th congressional district (died 1938 in the United states).
4 September – John Dillon, land reform agitator, Irish Home Rule activist, nationalist politician, MP and last leader of the Irish Parliamentary Party (died 1927).
3 December – George Noble Plunkett, nationalist, politician, museum curator (died 1948).

Deaths
23 May – Richard Lalor Sheil, politician, writer and orator (born 1791).
1 September – Anne Devlin, Irish republican and housekeeper to Robert Emmet (born 1780).

Census
 Surviving 1851 Census Returns of Ireland

References

 
1850s in Ireland
Ireland
Years of the 19th century in Ireland
 Ireland